Amar Drina (born 30 May 2002) is a Bosnian professional footballer who plays as a centre-back for Bosnian Premier League club Željezničar and the Bosnia and Herzegovina U21 national team.

Born in Sarajevo, he started his professional career at hometown club Željezničar.

Club career

Željezničar
In July 2021, after passing all the younger levels of hometown club Željezničar, Drina signed his first professional contract. He made his debut in a 3–0 win over Krupa on 30 May 2021.

On 20 June 2022, Drina extended his contract with Željezničar for another three years.

International career
Drina is a member of the Bosnia and Herzegovina national under-21 team. He has represented Bosnia and Herzegovina at all youth levels.

Career statistics

Club

References

External links
Amar Drina at Sofascore

2002 births
Living people
Footballers from Sarajevo
Bosnia and Herzegovina footballers
Bosnia and Herzegovina youth international footballers
Bosnia and Herzegovina under-21 international footballers
Association football defenders
FK Željezničar Sarajevo players
Premier League of Bosnia and Herzegovina players